Lisbon Story can refer to:
 The Lisbon Story (musical), a 1943 West End musical by Harry Parr Davies and Harold Purcell
 Lisbon Story (1946 film), a British film directed by Paul L. Stein
 Lisbon Story (1994 film), a film directed by Wim Wenders
 Lisbon Story Centre, a museum located at Praça do Comércio, in Lisbon